Mouteb Al-Faouri is a Jordanian Olympic middle-distance runner. He represented his country in the men's 1500 meters and the men's 800 meters at the 1984 Summer Olympics. His time was a 3:59.85 in the 1500, and a 1:53.89 in the 800 heats.

References 

1960 births
Living people
Jordanian male middle-distance runners
Olympic athletes of Jordan
Athletes (track and field) at the 1984 Summer Olympics